Love Live! Superstar!! is an anime television series produced by Bandai Namco Filmworks (formerly known as Sunrise) as the fourth installment in the Love Live! franchise. It is directed by Takahiko Kyogoku, with the screenplay written by Jukki Hanada and Atsushi Saito designing the characters. The series follows five high school girls who overcome personal challenges as members of their school idol group Liella! on their way to gaining prominence in the school idol world. The first season aired 12 episodes on NHK Educational TV from July 11 to October 17, 2021. A second season aired from July 17 to October 9, 2022. A third season has been announced. Crunchyroll (previously known as Funimation) has licensed the series for international releases.

For the first season, Liella! perform both the opening and ending themes, titled "Start!! True Dreams" and  respectively, from episode 2 onwards. Special animated music videos made specifically for the NHK Educational TV broadcast featuring original songs by Liella! air after each episode titled "Songs of Liella!".


Episode list

Season 1

Season 2

Notes

References

Lists of anime episodes
Love Live!